Hunan Provincial People's Stadium (Simplified Chinese: 湖南省人民体育场) is a football stadium in Changsha, Hunan, China. This stadium holds 6,000 people.

http://www.caryouyou.com/dest/hunan/changsha/jingdian/20070820/12023.html

Football venues in China
Athletics (track and field) venues in China
Sports venues in Hunan